Lisa Laetitia Westerhof (born 2 November 1981, in De Bilt) is a sailor from the Netherlands. 
Westerhof represented her country at the Optimist World Championships in 1995 and 1996, becoming only the second girl to win the championship outright. 

She sailed at the 2004 Summer Olympics in Athens. With crew Margriet Matthijsse took Westerhof 9th place as helmsman in the Dutch Women's 470. Westerhof's second Olympic appearance was during the 2012 Olympics in Weymouth again as helmsman in the Women's 470. Now with Lobke Berkhout as crew Westerhof took the Bronze.

Professional life
Westerhof lives in Scheveningen, studied economics at the Erasmus University in Rotterdam, and is a First Officer on the Boeing 737 for Air France KLM.

References

External links
 
 
 

1981 births
Living people
Dutch female sailors (sport)
Olympic medalists in sailing
Olympic bronze medalists for the Netherlands
Olympic sailors of the Netherlands
Sailors at the 2004 Summer Olympics – 470
Sailors at the 2012 Summer Olympics – 470
Medalists at the 2012 Summer Olympics
World champions in sailing for the Netherlands
470 class world champions
Optimist class world champions
Erasmus University Rotterdam alumni
People from De Bilt
Sportspeople from Utrecht (province)
20th-century Dutch women
21st-century Dutch women